In Greek mythology, Pyrrha was the daughter of Epimetheus and Pandora.

Pyrrha may also refer to:

 632 Pyrrha, a minor planet
 Pyrrha (island), an island off Crete
 Pyrrha (Caria), a town of ancient Caria, now in Turkey
 Pyrrha (Euboea), an ancient town on the Greek island of Euboea
 Pyrrha (Lesbos), an ancient town on the Greek island of Lesbos
 Pyrrha (Lycia), a town of ancient Lycia, now in Turkey 
 Pyrrha (Thessaly), a city in ancient Thessaly, Greece
 Celaenorrhinus pyrrha, a hesperiid butterfly
 Pyrrha Jewelry, a jewelry design company
 Pyrrha Alexandra, a character in Soul Calibur V
 Pyrrha Nikos, a character in RWBY
 An ode (1.5) by Horace
 A pseudonym used by Achilles on Skyros while he was in hiding before the Trojan War